Ivan Tingal may refer to:
the Tingal people
the Tingal language